Alfred Thiele (21 September 1886 – 19 September 1957) was a German sculptor, and medallist.

Life

Provenance and training 
Alfred Thiele was born in Leipzig.   Carl Thiele (1859-1929), his father, was a book dealer.   Alfred's initial training was in stonework and wood carving.  Then between 1903 and 1908, he attended the Arts Academy ("Hochschule für Grafik und Buchkunst") in Leipzig.   His teachers included Adolf Lehnert and Bruno Héroux.

Artist 
After a short stay in Munich Thiele returned to Leipzig and embarked on a career as a freelance artist.   Starting in 1910, his work involved medallions and wall-mounted plaques.   From 1911 he became more focused on figurines and participation in exhibitions.   His early style reflected the naturalist and Jugendstil influences of the time, but during the 1920s he moved on through expressionism to so-called new realism.   Influenced by Aristide Maillol and Wilhelm Lehmbruck, his artistic interest turned towards the presentation of physical movement and expressions of the human body.   By 1928 he had become sufficiently well known to justify a newspaper headline that read "There is only one sculptor in Leipzig:  Alfred Thiele!" ("Es gibt nur einen Bildhauer in Leipzig: Alfred Thiele!").   During the 1930s he began to apply the skills acquired working on small figures to much larger figures.   Thiele applies his outstanding powers of observation, his sense for movement and other specialist abilities to developing a mastery of animal sculptures.   Some of his designs were reproduced on an industrial scale by the  firm, offered as both glazed and unglazed porcelain figures.   He also applied himself to statues other adornments for monumental grave stones.

Teacher 
As a teacher, and later as director for sculpture classes at the Leipzig Arts Academy between 1921 and 1953, Thiele exercised a great influence.   One example (among many) was setting up a close collaborative relationship between the academy and the city zoo which created a tradition of animal sculpture in Leipzig which endures to this day.

Output (selection) 

 1917 Tanzender weiblicher Akt, Bronze auf Serpentinsockel
 1918 Porträtrelief Karl Kaiser und König von Österreich-Ungarn, Bronze
 1919 Fliehende Daphne, Bronze auf Marmorsockel
 1919 Kriegerdenkmal, Leisnig
 1920 Majolikarelief Grabstätte Degener, Südfriedhof Leipzig
 1921 Frauenkopf, fränkischer Muschelkalk
 1921 Porträtrelief Wilhelm Felsche, Bronze
 1924 Figur Seele, Bronze
 1924 Hockender Akt, Bronze
 1924 Trampeltier, Bronze
 1925 Löwe, Bronze auf Marmorsockel
 1925 Sitzende, Bronze
 1925 Anbetende, Bronze auf Muschelkalksockel
 1926 Leopard, an der Pfote leckend, Bronze
 1927 Springender Hengst, Bronze auf Holzsockel
 1927 Porträtrelief Arthur Hantzsch, Bronze
 1928 Laufendes Dromedar, Bronze auf Marmorplinthe
 1928 Bildnisköpfe in Terrakotta mit leichter Einfärbung von Haar und Lippen
 1929 Schlafender Löwe, Grabstätte Wetzold, fränkischer Muschelkalkstein, Südfriedhof Leipzig
 1929 Sinnende, Zementguss, Grassimuseum Leipzig
 1929 Schreitende, Bronze (from 2012: Museum für angewandte Kunst, Leipzig)
 1932 Liegendes Gnu, Bronze
 1933 Lautenspielerin, Zementguss
 1933 Porträtrelief Julius Klengel, Bronze
 1936 Johannisfigur am  in Leipzig
 1937 Korbtragende Frau, Wohnhaus Johannisplatz, Leipzig
 1938 Polospieler, Bronze
 1938 Nach abgeworfenem Speer, Bronze
 1938 Liegender Baisabock, Bronze
 1938 Panther, an Pfote leckend, Bronze
 1938 Liegender Tiger, Bronze
 1941 Der Morgen, Bronze
 1941 Pelikan, Bronze
 1942 Liegender Gepard, Bronze auf Muschelkalksockel
 1947 Stehende, Bronze
 1948 Witternder Tiger, Bronze
 1949 Kumpel vor der Einfahrt, Bronze
 1949 Laufende Giraffe, Bronze
 1950 Relief Arbeit und Handel, Messehofpassage Leipzig
 1953–55 Bauplastik, Ringbebauung Rossplatz, Leipzig
 1956 Liegendes Guanako, Bronze

References

Artists from Leipzig
German sculptors
1886 births
1957 deaths
Hochschule für Grafik und Buchkunst Leipzig alumni